Uncle Ike's Pot Shop is an establishment in Seattle, Washington, licensed by the Washington State Liquor and Cannabis Board to sell cannabis to the public. It opened on September 30, 2014 and was the second cannabis retailer in Seattle, after Cannabis City.  it led the state of Washington in cannabis retail sales at over $1 million per month. The proprietor is Ian Karl Eisenberg, aka "Uncle Ike". The business is both praised for being the first to inform consumers about pesticides in their product, and criticized for contributing to gentrification of the neighborhood it is located in, Seattle's Central District. When it opened, the shop was said to be "built like a fortress" with security provided by a company owned and staffed by ex-military service members. As of 2022, Uncle Ike's has expanded to five shops in Seattle, including a outlet store in the White Center neighborhood.

Controversy
Protests at the shop started a week after it opened in 2014.

The Seattle chapter of Black Lives Matter, under the leadership of activist Marissa Johnson, was criticized for allowing anti-Semitic remarks at some 2015 rallies concerning Eisenberg's ownership.

After a Martin Luther King Jr. Day, 2016 protest outside his store, Eisenberg replied through social media that he had moved into vacant property and his several businesses do not contribute to gentrification. Some protestors complained on 420 Day (April 20), 2016, that the business is located three feet (1 meter) from a church that sometimes has youth events. More anti-Semitic comments from a Seattle activist were recorded by Eisenberg and posted online in 2017.

Eisenberg reported more vandalism during a July 22, 2020 riot which he considered unrelated to the Capitol Hill Autonomous Zone protests, but falsely labeling him as a former member of the Israel Defense Forces.

References

2014 establishments in Washington (state)
2014 in cannabis
American companies established in 2014
Cannabis companies of the United States
Cannabis in Washington (state)
Cannabis shops
Companies based in Seattle
Retail companies established in 2014
Cannabis dispensaries in the United States